Lucero is a given name. Notable people with the name include

Female given name
Lucero (entertainer) (born Lucero Hogaza León, 1969), Mexican entertainer
Lucero Cuevas (born 1996), Mexican footballer
Lucero Soto (born 1948), Mexican badminton player
Lucero Miroslava Montemayor Gracia (born 1990), Mexican beauty pageant titleholder and sportscaster

Male given name
Lucero Álvarez (born 1985), Uruguayan footballer
Lucero Suárez (born 1963), Mexican producer

See also

Lucero (band)

Spanish feminine given names
Spanish masculine given names